The Cabinet of Fiji is a Government body of Ministers appointed by the Prime Minister of Fiji and responsible to the Parliament of Fiji. The Cabinet's constitutional basis is sections 90 to 96 of the 2013 Constitution of Fiji.

Cabinet consists of the Prime Minister as chair and a number of Ministers. With the exception of the Attorney-General, they must be members of Parliament. Ministers hold office at the pleasure of the Prime Minister, or until they resign or cease to be MPs.

The cabinet is responsible to Parliament. Ministers must provide regular reports to Parliament on their areas of responsibility and must appear before Parliament or any committee on a request to answer questions about their areas of responsibility.

Prior to the 2006 Fijian coup d'état and the 2009 Fijian constitutional crisis, Fiji's Cabinet was governed by the 1997 Constitution. An unusual feature of the constitution was to require a compulsory coalition cabinet, with every political party with more than 8 seats in the 71-member parliament required to be offered a proportionate number of cabinet posts. The model was not successfully implemented for nearly a decade, with the governments of both Mahendra Chaudhry and Laisenia Qarase refusing to offer Cabinet seats to their political opponents. It was only after the 2006 election that a full multi-party Cabinet was appointed. The multi-party model was not continued in the 2013 constitution.

Current cabinet
After the 2022 Fijian general elections:

References

 
Fiji, Cabinet